Anufriyevskaya is a rural locality (a village) in Beketovskoye Rural Settlement, Vozhegodsky District, Vologda Oblast, Russia. The population was 15 as of 2002.

Geography 
Anufriyevskaya is located 61 km northwest of Vozhega (the district's administrative centre) by road. Ruchyevskaya is the nearest rural locality.

References 

Rural localities in Vozhegodsky District